SNR 0509-67.5 is a remnant from a supernova in the Large Magellanic Cloud (LMC), that is 160,000 light years away in the constellation Dorado. It displays a clear shock wave shock shell pattern.

It was probably a type Ia supernova, as indicated by the detection in 2004 of the elements silicon and iron. Any surviving stars should not have moved far from the site of the explosion. Researchers at the Space Telescope Science Institute in Baltimore, Md. have identified light from the supernova that was reflected off of interstellar dust, delaying its arrival at Earth by 400 years, allowing scientists to study the initial blast. This delay, called a light echo, allowed the astronomers to measure the spectral signature of the light from the explosion. By virtue of the color signature, astronomers were able to deduce it was a Type Ia supernova. Scientists have also observed the supernova remnant at X-ray and visible wavelengths, and studied a light echo that helps assess the energy involved in this unusually energetic supernova.

References

 
 NASA

Supernova remnants
Dorado (constellation)
Large Magellanic Cloud